Victoria Jane Horn (also known as Lady V) is an English Grammy Award winning songwriter and ASCAP and BMI heavy rotation award winner.

Personal life
Victoria Horn began studying the piano at age three and later learned the guitar. At an early age she showed promise in the areas of both fashion design and music (winning a young designer award at age 16.) She is also an accomplished show jumper with a long familial tradition in the sport. She is often referred to by her writer/feature artist name "Lady V."

Musical career
By the age of 17, Horn had some musical experience behind her including live performances. During this year she became a latter-day member of 1970s pop group The New Seekers under the name Vikki James. Not long after this she recorded for other artists on a number of dance songs. Her first major songwriting release, a song from 2001 called "Days Go By" performed by Dirty Vegas, peaked at No. 14 on the U.S. Billboard Hot 100 and No. 1 on the U.S. Billboard Hot Dance Play following its implementation in an advertisement for the Mitsubishi Eclipse. "Days Go By" continued to garner heavy radio play throughout 2002 and win a Grammy Award for Best Dance Recording as well as an ASCAP Pop Music Award for its author.

In 2003, a song she cowrote for Enrique Iglesias (featuring Kelis) entitled "Not in Love" won the Billboard Latin Dance song of the year and enjoyed top ten placement in many sales charts around the world.

In 2008, Horn co-wrote the song "This is Us" which appeared on the Keyshia Cole album A Different Me. The album went on to sell one million copies. As well, during this year, Horn collaborated with songwriters David "DQ" Quiñones, Erika Nuri, Rodney Jerkins, and Evan Bogart to found The Writing Camp. The Writing Camp wrote Brandy's debut single "Right Here (Departed)" off her 2008 album Human. The song was picked as the album's leading single and Brandy's first release with Epic Records, following her split with Atlantic Records in 2005. Fellow co-writer Rodney Jerkins said about Ms. Horn, "'I've had the pleasure of writing with Victoria Horn on a lot of great music. Her great sense of melody and new fresh approach to concepts and lyrics is what I love about her writing. She is definitely one of my new favorite songwriters to work with."

In 2009, Demi Lovato's Here We Go Again album, on which Horn wrote the song "Got Dynamite," released straight to no. 1 on the Billboard chart.

In late 2012, Horn began working more in the genre of electronic dance music. Her vocals are featured on many DJ records and she has begun writing for artists including David Guetta, Markus Schulz, Armin van Buuren, Above and Beyond, and Chicane.

Horn is also active within the songwriting community. She runs a private professional songwriters and producers rights group called the Songwriter Awareness Collective, that represents 800 musicians and works closely with BASCA, PRS and ASCAP. She maintains a Facebook group that provides songwriters with a forum to discuss issues relevant to their field.

Aside from EDM and her artist writes, Horn is now focusing on writing with just a few key songwriters such as Los from the Jackieboyz, EDM artist and songwriter Christian Burns and Rhys Fulber - delerium whom she shares a cinematic electronic project.

Discography

Victoria Horn is credited as a writer or co-writer of the following songs.
Dirty Vegas - "Days Go By" (single) (Grammy Award and ASCAP Heavy Rotation Award winner)
Armin Van Buuren - "Wait for You (Song for the Ocean)", "Walk Through the Fire (Sunburn)"
Armin Van Buuren feat. Lauren Evans - "Alone" 
Markus Schulz - "Winter Kills Me" (feat. Lady V)
Above and Beyond - "Counting Down the Days"
Brandy - "Right Here (Departed)" (single)
Keyshia Cole - "This is Us"
Enrique Iglesias feat. Kelis - "Not in Love" (single) (Billboard Latin Dance Award)
Demi Lovato - "Got Dynamite"
Selena Gomez / Katy Perry - "Rock God"
Markus Schulz - "Erase You" (feat. Lady V)
Darin - "That Love"
David Archuleta - "Look Around," "Day After Tomorrow", "Everything and More", "Heart Falls Out", “You Worry”, “Need”, “Brave”, “Good in the Bad”, “Future Self”, “Postcards in the Sky”, “Waiting in the Stars”, “Therapy”
Riva Feat Dannii Minogue - "Who Do You Love Now" (single) (Cool Cut, Buzz Chart, and Dance No. 1)
Ryandan - "Bring Me Back" (upcoming), "Silence Speaks" (upcoming), "Already Gone" (upcoming), "Blameless" (upcoming)
Rui Da Silva feat. Victoria Horn - "Feel the Love" (single) (Cool Cut No. 1)
Kinobe feat. Victoria Horn - "Butterfly" (single)
Kate Ryan - "Alive" (single), "I Surrender" (single)
The Factory feat Pete Tong - "I Couldn't Love You More" (single) (Cool Cut No. 1)
Kelly Sweet - "We Are One," "Ready for Love," "Eternity," "How 'bout You,"
Harry Romero - "Love is Your Drug"
Tata Young - "Lonely in Space"
DT8 - "Breathe"
DT8 feat. Andrea Britton - "Winter" (single) (Cool Cut and Buzz Chart No. 1)
Feela - "Sweet Temptation" (single) (Cool Cut and Buzz Chart No. 1)
Double 99 feat. Victoria Horn - "Shiver"
Edurne - "No Quiero Mas"
Three Graces- "Dile"
Ben's Brother - "She is Love"
Peroxide - "The Secret"
Janet Leon - "Keep It on the Low," Lladeladeda"
Floorje - "Blindspot"
Boo Hewerdine "Dream Baby," "Stowaway"
Anke - "All I'll Ever Need"
The Soap Girls - "Sour"
Elva Hsiao - "Sync Breathing"
Fawni - "Ready When You Are
Cara Q - "Away from You"
Wynter Gordon - "Putting It Out There (Pride)"
The Freemasons - After You're Gone
The Freemasons feat. Wynter Gordon - "Believer" (Cool Cut No. 1)
Jessica Jarrell feat Mann - "Ladder"
Doman and Gooding - "Hooked on You"
Girls Generation - "XYZ"
Joe Cocker - "I'll Be Your Doctor"
Peter Andre - "Don't Give Up"
Cymphonique - "Hey Now"
Cody Simpson and Madison - "Valentine"
Antillas - "I Belong to No One" (feat. Victoria Horn)
DJ Sammy - "Shut Up and Kiss Me"
Conjure One - "Then There Was None" (feat. Christian Burns)
Conjure One - "I'll Be Your Gold" (feat. Victoria Horn)
Sky Ferreira - "Ditch That Bitch"
Joachim/David Guetta - "Final Call"
Nikki Williams - "Loser"
Jessica Sanchez - "Crazy Glue" (American Idol)
Elise Mcgrow - "Ok Cupid" 
Moguai - "Sleep When I'm Dead"
Shawn Hook - "Million Ways"
George Perris - "Falling Into Beautiful"
Chicane - "Photograph" (feat. Christian Burns)
Tiesto vs Two Loud - "We Are the Ones" (feat. Christian Burns)
Dennis Sheperd & Luick - Glass House

References

External links
 

1971 births
Living people
Songwriters from California
Musicians from Kent
People from Maidstone
English songwriters